Martin Edmunds (born 1955) is an American poet. His work has appeared in the Paris Review, The New Yorker, Ep;phany, and elsewhere.

Works
"December 27, 1988", AGNI 56, 2002
The High Road to Taos, University of Illinois Press (1994)

Screenplay
 Passion in the Desert (1998) (additional script)

Anthologies

Awards
 1993 National Poetry Series, for The High Road to Taos
 1991 Discovery-The Nation prize

References

Living people
American male poets
1955 births